Eugene "Nudie" Hughes (born 1957/8) is a former Gaelic footballer who played at senior level for the Monaghan county team.

Playing career
Nudie helped Monaghan to victory in the 1985 National Football League Final defeating Armagh and he collected three Ulster Senior Football Championship medals in 1979, defeating Donegal, in 1985, beating Derry  and again in 1988, defeating  Tyrone in Clones. Nudie was the first Monaghan man to receive an All-Star Award and featured regularly on All-Star teams selected in 1979, 1985 and 1988. He collected a Railway Cup Medal with Ulster in 1984 and he was listed at number 115 in The 125 greatest stars of the GAA lists.

In December 2018, shortly after attending the All Stars ceremony at which three Monaghan players received awards in November, Hughes was diagnosed with liver and colon cancer and spoke about it in June 2020.

References

1950s births
Living people
Castleblayney Faughs Gaelic footballers
Monaghan inter-county Gaelic footballers